New Hedges is a village in the community of St Mary Out Liberty, Pembrokeshire, Wales. It is midway between Saundersfoot and Tenby. The population was 594 in 2011.

References

Villages in Pembrokeshire